Radial  is a geometric term of location which may refer to:

Mathematics and Direction
 Vector (geometric), a line
 Radius, adjective form of 
 Radial distance, a directional coordinate in a polar coordinate system
 Radial set
 A bearing from a waypoint, such as a VHF omnidirectional range

Biology
 Radial artery, the main artery of the lateral aspect of the forearm
 Radial nerve, supplies the posterior portion of the upper limb
 Radial symmetry, one of the types of distribution of body parts or shapes in biology
 Radius (bone), a bone of the forearm

Technology
 Radial (radio), lines which radiate from a radio antenna
 Radial axle, on a locomotive or carriage
 Radial compressor
 Radial delayed blowback
 Radial engine
 Radial tire
 Radial, Inc., e-commerce business

See also 
 Axial (disambiguation)
 Radiate (disambiguation)